The ARIA Singles Chart ranks the best-performing singles in Australia. Its data, published by the Australian Recording Industry Association, is based collectively on the weekly physical and digital sales and streams of singles. Four songs have so far topped the chart in 2023, with "All I Want for Christmas Is You" by Mariah Carey being number one in a sixth consecutive year. Two artists, SZA and Miley Cyrus, reached the top for the first time.

Chart history

Number-one artists

See also
 2023 in music
 List of number-one albums of 2023 (Australia)

References

Australia singles
Number-one singles
2023